is a railway station in the city of Tsubame, Niigata, Japan, operated by East Japan Railway Company (JR East).

Lines

Station layout
The station consists of two ground-level side platforms serving two tracks. However, one of the platforms is not normally used. The platforms are connected by an underground passageway.

The station has a Midori no Madoguchi  staffed ticket office. Suica farecard cannot be used at this station.

Platforms

History 
It was renamed to its present name on 1 April 1983. With the privatization of Japanese National Railways (JNR) on 1 April 1987, the station came under the control of JR East. A new station building was completed March 2000.

Passenger statistics
In fiscal 2017, the station was used by an average of 496 passengers daily (boarding passengers only).

Surrounding area
Bunsui Post Office

See also
 List of railway stations in Japan

References

External links

 Bunsui Station information 

Railway stations in Niigata Prefecture
Stations of East Japan Railway Company
Railway stations in Japan opened in 1912
Echigo Line
Tsubame, Niigata